Cesare Jonni (21 January 1917 – 11 July 2008) was an Italian football referee.

Refereeing career
In 1951, Jonni assigned to referee in Serie A, the top flight of football in Italy. Three years later, he was appointed as a FIFA referee.

In 1960, Jonni was appointed as a referee for the 1960 European Nations' Cup, where he officiated two matches. The first was a semi-final match between Czechoslovakia and the Soviet Union. The second match he officiated was the third place play-off between Czechoslovakia and France.

Less than two months later, Jonni was appointed as a referee for the 1960 Summer Olympics, where he officiated two group stage matches.

In 1962, Jonni was appointed as a referee for the 1962 FIFA World Cup, where he officiated a group stage match between the Soviet Union and Uruguay.

Jonni retired from refereeing in 1964.

References

External links
 Profile at worldfootball.net

1917 births
2008 deaths
People from Macerata
Italian football referees
1960 European Nations' Cup referees
1962 FIFA World Cup referees
Sportspeople from the Province of Macerata